Worcester County  is the easternmost county of the U.S. state of Maryland. As of the 2020 census, the population was 52,460. Its county seat is Snow Hill. 

It is the only county of Maryland that borders the Atlantic Ocean, and the only county bordering both Delaware and Virginia. The county was named for Mary Arundell, the wife of Sir John Somerset, a son of Henry Somerset, 1st Marquess of Worcester. She was sister to Anne Arundell (Anne Arundel County), wife of Cecil Calvert, 2nd Baron Baltimore (Cecil County), the first Proprietor and Proprietary Governor of the Province of Maryland.

Worcester County is included in the Salisbury, MD-DE Metropolitan Statistical Area.  The county includes the entire length of the state's ocean and tidewater coast along the Intracoastal Waterway bordering Assawoman Bay, Isle of Wight Bay, Sinepuxent Bay, and Chincoteague Bay between the sand barrier islands of Fenwick Island and Assateague Island bordering the Atlantic Ocean coast. It is home to the popular vacation resort area of Ocean City, founded 1875, as well as wild habitats on the primitive wilderness areas on Assateague Island and in the Pocomoke River and Swamp.

History
Worcester County was created by the division of the formerly larger Eastern Shore's Somerset County in 1742.  The county seat, which was previously located near the confluence of Dividing Creek with the Pocomoke River, was later transferred to the river port of Snow Hill, at the head of navigation of the Pocomoke, now near the center of the new county.

Both the areas of Somerset and Worcester Counties were divided into old colonial divisions of "hundreds", from south to north: Mattapony, Pocomoke, Boquetenorton, Wicomico, and Baltimore Hundreds.  Later subdivisions of these hundreds added Pitts Creek, Acquango, Queponco, and Buckingham & Worcester Hundreds, all of which in turn eventually became election districts for the newly independent state following American independence. Competing territorial claims between the Proprietor family of the Calverts and the Lords Baltimore in the old Province of Maryland and the Penns of the neighboring Province of Pennsylvania to the north and of what later became the state of Delaware to the east led to the surveying of Worcester County's northern border, the "Transpeninsular Line" in 1751, though boundary disputes continued through the rest of the colonial period, not totally settled until the work of the famous Charles Mason and Jeremiah Dixon with their "Mason–Dixon line". In 1779, Stephen Decatur, the famous United States Navy officer and hero of the First Barbary War and the Second Barbary War in the early 1800s, and leading into the War of 1812, was born at Sinepuxent, near what is today the town of Berlin.

Originally settled by European immigrants of British and Irish stock, along with slaves of mainly West African descent, Worcester County was divided during the colonial period into several Church of England parishes, though Quakers, Presbyterians, and later Methodists also set up meeting houses. Like the border states in general, Worcester County had a high proportion of free people of color for many decades before the Civil War, due in part to the influence of initially Quakerism, and later Methodism.  During the 1840s and 1850s, Worcester County, Maryland had the highest portion of free people of color per capita out of any county in Maryland.  It was one of the few counties in the state with an active abolitionist movement.  Most abolitionists in the county were Methodists, Quakers and Presbyterians, however the slave-owning community was overwhelmingly Baptist and Catholic.  First-generation immigrants from England and Germany were also overwhelmingly abolitionists in Worcester County.  During the civil war in Worcester County first generation immigrants from England and Germany were known for siding with the Union whereas first generation Irish Catholic immigrants from Ireland overwhelmingly sided with the Confederacy and were known for being some of the leaders of the Copperheads or "Peace Democrats" in Worcester County.

Worcester County was primarily an agricultural area from its inception, first planting tobacco, but when the quality produced in the area's sandy soil could not compete with that produced elsewhere, they began growing wheat, corn, and livestock. Early industrial activity included the smelting of bog iron ore in a brick blast furnace to make pig iron at Furnacetown in the first half of the 19th century. The presence of large bald cypress swamps along the Pocomoke River led to logging, the manufacture of roofing shingles, and shipbuilding along the river at Newtown (later Pocomoke City). The arrival of steam-powered water transport and then the railroad opened urban markets to another of Worcester County's principal products: seafood, particularly shellfish. Oysters, clams, and crabs were shipped to Baltimore, Philadelphia, and New York. Soon after the Civil War (to each side of which Worcester County sent soldiers), parts of both Worcester and Somerset Counties were combined to create, in 1867, Wicomico County. Also in the later 19th century, the seaside resort of Ocean City was founded.

Truck farming and the canning industry came to the fore during the early 20th century. However, both the seafood industry and truck farming declined after mid-century, due to overfishing on the one hand, and the opening of California's Central Valley to irrigated agriculture on the other, but the advent of the large-scale poultry industry filled this gap. The expansion of Ocean City since the 1960s has turned the northern part of the county from a summer resort to an expanding year-round community.

Two major storms influenced the course of Worcester County history in the 20th Century: the hurricane of August 1933, which badly damaged Ocean City and Public Landing, but also cut the Ocean City Inlet and passageway between the inner bays west of the sandy barrier islands of Assawoman Bay, Sinepuxent Bay and Assateague Channel and Bay and the Atlantic Ocean, and the later Ash Wednesday "Nor'easter" of 1962, which destroyed much of the residential development on Assateague Island and led to the creation of the National Seashore and State Park.

The county has a number of properties on the National Register of Historic Places.

Politics and government
Worcester County was granted home rule in 1976 under a state code under the amendments to the fourth Maryland Constitution of 1867. The Circuit Court of Maryland and District Court of Maryland are located in Snow Hill with two district courthouses. The county is governed by a Board of Commissioners elected from seven districts.

The members of the County Council as of 2022 are:

Worcester County lies wholly in Senate District 38 and is served in the Maryland House of Delegates in Districts 38A and 38C. Members listed below as of 2018 are:

Geography
It is the third-largest county in Maryland by total area.

The terrain is mostly level and coastal.

National protected area
 Assateague Island National Seashore (part)
 Chincoteague National Wildlife Refuge (part)

Adjacent counties
 Accomack County, Virginia (south)
 Somerset County (west)
 Sussex County, Delaware (north)
 Wicomico County (northwest)

Climate
The county has a humid subtropical climate (Cfa.) All monthly temperature averages are above freezing and eight months in most of the county are above 50 °F (10 °C.) Three months are above 22 °C (71.6 °F.)

Transportation
Freight trains run from Snow Hill north to Berlin and the Delaware border on the Maryland and Delaware Railroad, and the main line (formerly Pennsylvania Railroad) from Philadelphia to Cape Charles, Virginia and Norfolk runs through the southwestern corner of the county, operated by the Delmarva Central Railroad. The Ocean City Municipal Airport is located near Ocean City, but has no scheduled service. The nearest airport with commercial air service is the Salisbury–Ocean City–Wicomico Regional Airport near Salisbury.

Shore Transit provides public transportation in Worcester County, operating bus routes connecting Pocomoke City, Snow Hill, Berlin, and Ocean City with Princess Anne and Salisbury. Ocean City Transportation operates bus service branded as Beach Bus in Ocean City. DART First State's Beach Bus Route 208 connects Ocean City with the Delaware Beaches in the summer months.

Major highways

Demographics

2020 census

Note: the US Census treats Hispanic/Latino as an ethnic category. This table excludes Latinos from the racial categories and assigns them to a separate category. Hispanics/Latinos can be of any race.

2010 census
As of the 2010 United States Census, there were 51,454 people, 22,229 households, and 14,598 families residing in the county. The racial makeup of the county was 82.0% white, 13.6% black or African American, 1.1% Asian, 0.3% American Indian, 1.2% from other races, and 1.7% from two or more races. Those of Hispanic or Latino origin made up 3.2% of the population. In terms of ancestry the county was 18.9% German, 18.2% Irish, 17.1% English and 7.7% Italian. If people who wrote they were a combination of "Irish", "English" and "German" (in any order) were counted as one group, they would be 31.9%, and the largest group in the county.

Of the 22,229 households, 24.2% had children under the age of 18 living with them, 50.9% were married couples living together, 10.9% had a female householder with no husband present, 34.3% were non-families, and 28.0% of all households were made up of individuals. The average household size was 2.28 and the average family size was 2.76. The median age was 48.1 years.

The median income for a household in the county was $55,487 and the median income for a family was $67,408. Males had a median income of $44,986 versus $37,785 for females. The per capita income for the county was $31,520. About 6.2% of families and 10.1% of the population were below the poverty line, including 16.2% of those under age 18 and 6.5% of those age 65 or over.

2000 census
As of the census of 2000, there were 46,543 people, 19,694 households, and 13,273 families residing in the county. There were 47,360 housing units at an average density of 100 per square mile (39/km2). The racial makeup of the county was 81.20% White, 16.66% Black or African American, 0.18% Native American, 0.61% Asian, 0.02% Pacific Islander, 0.37% from other races, and 0.97% from two or more races.  1.28% of the population were Hispanic or Latino of any race. 15.7% were of German, 13.3% English, 12.6% Irish, 11.1% American and 6.0% Italian ancestry.

There were 19,694 households, out of which 24.50% had children under the age of 18 living with them, 53.20% were married couples living together, 10.80% had a female householder with no husband present, and 32.60% were non-families. 26.30% of all households were made up of individuals, and 11.60% had someone living alone who was 65 years of age or older.  The average household size was 2.33 and the average family size was 2.79.

In the county, the population was spread out, with 20.50% under the age of 18, 6.20% from 18 to 24, 26.40% from 25 to 44, 26.90% from 45 to 64, and 20.10% who were 65 years of age or older.  The median age was 43 years. For every 100 females, there were 95.20 males.  For every 100 females age 18 and over, there were 92.30 males.

The median income for a household in the county was $40,650, and the median income for a family was $47,293. Males had a median income of $31,735 versus $24,319 for females. The per capita income for the county was $22,505.  About 7.20% of families and 9.60% of the population were below the poverty line, including 17.00% of those under age 18 and 6.40% of those age 65 or over.

Education
The following institutions are part of the Worcester County public school system, governed by the Worcester County Board of Education:

Showell Elementary School
Buckingham Elementary School
Ocean City Elementary School
Snow Hill Elementary School
Pocomoke Elementary School
Berlin Intermediate School
Stephen Decatur Middle School
Snow Hill Middle School
Pocomoke Middle School
Stephen Decatur High School
Snow Hill High School
Pocomoke High School
Worcester Technical High School
Cedar Chapel Special School

In the fall of 2008 Worcester County has plans to open Worcester Technical High School to all residents of the county, to replace Worcester Career and Technology Center.

The following private schools also operate in Worcester County:

Worcester Preparatory School
Seaside Christian Academy
Most Blessed Sacrament Catholic School
Snow Hill Mennonite School
The Tidewater School by the Sea

Communities
This county contains the following incorporated municipalities:

City
Pocomoke City

Towns
Berlin
Ocean City
Snow Hill (county seat)

Census-designated places
The Census Bureau recognizes the following census-designated places in the county:

Bishopville
Girdletree
Newark
Ocean Pines
Stockton
West Ocean City
Whaleyville

Unincorporated communities

Boxiron
Cedartown
Friendship
Germantown
Goodwill
Ironshire
Klej Grange
Nassawango Hills
Public Landing
Showell
Sinepuxent
South Point
Taylorville
Whiton (partly in Wicomico County)

Notable residents
Spiro Agnew, former vice president
Stephen Decatur, naval officer
Linda Harrison, actress

See also
National Register of Historic Places listings in Worcester County, Maryland

References

Sources
 Touart, Paul Baker, Along the Seaboard Side: The Architectural History of Worcester County, Maryland (1994).

External links
Worcester County Government Website
Worcester County tourism website
Your Community Link: A Database of Community, Government, and Non-Profit organizations on the Lower Shore
1876 Maps of Worcester County (requires Java)

 

 
Maryland counties
1742 establishments in Maryland
Salisbury metropolitan area
Populated places established in 1742